Acompsia antirrhinella is a moth of the family Gelechiidae. It is found in southern France, Andorra and Spain.

The wingspan is 17–23 mm for males and 17–20 mm for females. The forewings are plain brown to greyish brown, mottled with black brown scales. There are three distinct black spots. The hindwings are grey. Adults are on wing from late June to August.

The larvae feed on Asarina procumbens under a silken spinning, which is attached to one or more leaves. The larva is long and tube-like and dark green to almost black in the final instar. The head is red. Larvae can be found from March to the end of May. Pupation takes place at the base of the host plant.

References

Moths described in 1866
Acompsia
Moths of Europe